South Staffordshire is a local government district in Staffordshire, England. The district lies to the north and west of the West Midlands county, bordering Shropshire to the west and Worcestershire to the south. It contains notable settlements such as Codsall, Cheslyn Hay, Great Wyrley, Penkridge, Brewood, Coven, Essington, Huntington, Weston-under-Lizard, Bilbrook, Wombourne, Himley, Perton and Featherstone. Codsall is the main administrative centre of South Staffordshire District. Many of the villages form both commuter and residential areas for the nearby towns of Cannock, Stafford and Telford, as well as the wider West Midlands County.

The district was formed on 1 April 1974, under the Local Government Act 1972, by the merger of Cannock Rural District (in the north) and Seisdon Rural District (in the south).

Its council is based in Codsall, The district covers a similar geographic area to South Staffordshire parliamentary constituency, although the north of the district is covered by the Stafford constituency. Sir Patrick Cormack of the Conservative Party held the South Staffordshire seat, and its predecessor, Staffordshire South-West, between 1974 and 2010, when he retired and the seat was won by Gavin Williamson for the Conservative Party.

Among the council's responsibilities is the provision of the 'South Staffordshire Link', a minibus service serving rural communities in the area.  Providing journeys on different routes on set days, this service is open to anyone unable to access normal bus services.  Potential customers have to book in advance.

Countryside
There are many beauty spots within the South Staffordshire district, for example the village of Wombourne has the Wom Brook Walk and the Bratch Locks on the Staffordshire and Worcestershire Canal in the nearby village of Bratch.
Other sites include:
 South Staffordshire Railway Walk: A  walk along the disused railway line of the Wombourne Branch Line.
 Baggeridge Country Park: A large and diverse country park located between Wombourne and Sedgley (in the Dudley Metropolitan Borough), which has won the national Green Flag Award for 11 years.
 Bluebell Woods, Perton: An internationally important site for Bluebells.
 Highgate Common: A large area of heathland near Swindon.
 Kinver Edge: A National Trust property, located in the south of the district which features the Holy Austin Rock Houses.
 Shoal Hill Common: A  site of lowland heaths and woodlands which can be found to the extreme north of the district.

Bunkers Tree Wood is also in the area and contains a large Corvid roost.

Local Government

As of June 2019, the political make-up of the local council was as follows:

References

 
Non-metropolitan districts of Staffordshire